Kiriath-Jearim (also Kiryat Ye'arim;  , "city of woods";  ;) was a city in the Land of Israel. It is mentioned 18 times in the Hebrew Bible. The biblical place was identified with Abu Ghosh.

Etymology
Other names are Kiriath-Ba'al, Ba'alah and Ba'ale-Judah (see, e.g. Joshua 15:60; 2 Samuel 6:2; 1 Chronicles 13:6), which implies the city was affiliated with Baal worship at an earlier date.

History

Kiriath-Jearim was described as a Hivite city linked to the Gibeonites (see Joshua 9:17). It was a key landmark in identifying the border between the tribes of Judah and Benjamin (see Joshua 15:9 & 18:14, 15). About 60 years (2 Samuel 6) afterward, the ark was moved to Jerusalem and placed in a tent outside the palace of David.

Kiriath-Jearim's change in designation from Kiriath-Ba'al (meaning City of Baal, or City of the Lord) may indicate the population change that took place after Joshua's military campaign to take possession of the land from its previous inhabitants. According to Israel Finkelstein and Thomas Romer, the possibility that Kiriath-ba‘al/Ba‘alah was the original name of the town, or more correctly its Northern name, hints that the god YHWH was worshipped as Baal, before that title became a negative link with “foreign” (Phoenician or other) storm gods.

The Hebrew Bible identifies at least one prophet of God who came from this town. Uriah, the son of Shemaiah, was from Kiriath-Jearim, and was a contemporary of Jeremiah who prophesied against Jerusalem (see Jeremiah 26:20). This aroused the wrath of King Jehoiakim (r. 609-598 BC) who sought to put Uriah to death. Uriah escaped to Egypt, where he was apprehended by the king's henchman and extradited to Jerusalem for execution and burial in an unmarked grave (Jeremiah 26:22-23).

The writer of the Books of Chronicles teaches that Shobal (possibly a descendant of Caleb) was "the father of Kiriath-Jearim" (see 1 Chronicles 2:50-53), possibly in the sense of being the founder of this town.

Descendants of Kiriath-Jearim were among the Jewish exiles who returned to Judea with Zerubbabel (see Nehemiah 7:29).

See also
 List of modern names for biblical place names

References

Hebrew Bible cities